The New Lower Inn Valley railway (German: Neue Unterinntalbahn) is a partially completed double-track high-speed main line of the Austrian railways. It connects the Brenner railway at Innsbruck and the Innsbruck bypass with the line to Kufstein, connecting with Germany, Salzburg, and eastern Austria. It forms a part of the core of the network of Austrian Federal Railways (ÖBB). The bypass is part of Line 1 of the Trans-European Transport Networks (TEN-T). In the future, these and other construction projects (including the Brenner Base Tunnel) are expected to reduce travel time on the Munich–Innsbruck route from 1:50 to 0:55 and on the Munich–Verona route from 5:20 to 2:20. The cost of the project amounted to €2.358 billion.

History

The Kundl–Baumkirchen section was opened on 26 December 2012.

Route: section 1: Kundl-Baumkirchen

One segment has been made as an upgrade of the original line while the other is an entirely new line:
 The section between Wörgl Kundl station and the original line is supplemented with a high-capacity line and forms a four-track line to a grade-separated junction at Radfeld.
After passing under the Inn and Jenbach railway station it continues to the grade-separated junction at Stans. The line descends again, and continues through the -long Terfner tunnel. In the tunnel there is space for a planned third track to allow overtaking movements, thus increasing line capacity. After underpassing the Fritzens-Wattens station it joins the old line at Baumkirchen where it separates towards Brenner/Verona via the Innsbruck bypass or towards Innsbruck/Arlberg via the original line.

Signalling

The new line is fitted with ETCS Level 2 signalling system. Four new electronic interlocking systems were built to control both the new line and the existing line. These systems are remotely controlled from the new Innsbruck operations control centre (Betriebsfernsteuerzentrale).

Planning: section 2: Brannenburg-Kundl 
The approximately  section from Brannenburg in Germany to Kundl is currently in the planning phase with route selection between Schaftenau and Kundl having been completed. The continuation of the route into Germany is currently being negotiated.

The selected route south from Schaftenau would leave the existing line via several short tunnels and cuttings to join the route of the A12 autobahn. It would then run through a nearly -long tunnel under the mountains of the southern Angerbergs and under the Inn, the A12 and the built-up areas of Kundl before emerging between the tracks of the existing line and running to the grade-separated junction at Radfeld.

References

High-speed railway lines in Austria
Railroad cutoffs
Railway lines opened in 2012
2012 establishments in Austria